Kenneth Rousseau Cooper (February 26, 1923 – November 2, 1997) was an American football player and coach.  He played professionally as a Guard for two seasons with the Baltimore Colts of the All-America Football Conference (AAFC) and the National Football League (NFL).  Cooper served as the head football coach at Austin Peay State College—now known as Austin Peay State University—in Clarksville, Tennessee from 1955 to 1957, compiling a record of 11–19–1.

Head coaching record

References

External links
 
 

1923 births
1997 deaths
American football guards
Austin Peay Governors football coaches
Baltimore Colts (1947–1950) players
Vanderbilt Commodores football players
People from Rogersville, Alabama
Coaches of American football from Alabama
Players of American football from Alabama